Luis Rodríguez (Feñito) (born July 13, 1969) is a volleyball player from Puerto Rico, who was a member of the Men's National Team that ended up in sixth place at the 2007 FIVB Men's World Cup in Japan. In the same year the middle-blocker claimed the silver medal at the NORCECA Championship in Anaheim.

References
 FIVB Profile

1969 births
Living people
Puerto Rican men's volleyball players
Volleyball players at the 2007 Pan American Games
Place of birth missing (living people)
Pan American Games competitors for Puerto Rico